Vladimir Anatolyevich Lebed (born 17 August 1973), known as Volodymyr Lebid in Ukrainian, is a Soviet, Ukrainian, and Russian retired football player.

International career
Lebed played in one game for Russia on 6 May 1995 in UEFA Euro 1996 qualifier against the Faroe Islands.

External links
 Player profile 
 
 

1973 births
Living people
Sportspeople from Kherson
Russian people of Ukrainian descent
Ukrainian emigrants to Russia
Soviet footballers
Ukrainian footballers
Russian footballers
Ukraine under-21 international footballers
Russia youth international footballers
Russia under-21 international footballers
Russia international footballers
Russian expatriate footballers
Expatriate footballers in Ukraine
Russian expatriate sportspeople in Ukraine
FC Dnipro players
FC Chornomorets Odesa players
FC Krystal Kherson players
MFC Mykolaiv players
SC Kakhovka players
FC Spartak Vladikavkaz players
PFC CSKA Moscow players
FC Zenit Saint Petersburg players
FC Moscow players
FC Sokol Saratov players
FC Volgar Astrakhan players
FC Enerhiya Nova Kakhovka players
FC Krystal Kherson managers
Ukrainian Premier League players
Ukrainian First League players
Ukrainian Second League players
Ukrainian Amateur Football Championship players
Russian Premier League players
Association football forwards
Ukrainian football managers
Soviet Top League players